Nolan is a surname, of Irish origin from Ó Nualláin, derived from Irish nuall meaning "noble, famous" combined with a diminutive suffix.

People with the surname "Nolan" include

A
Adam Nolan (born 1987), Irish boxer
Aidan Nolan (born 1993), Irish hurler
Alan Nolan (born 1985), Irish hurler
Albert Nolan (1934–2022), South African priest
Andrea Nolan, Irish veterinarian
Anna Nolan (born 1970), Irish television presenter
Anthony Nolan (politician), American politician

B
Barry Nolan (born 1947), American television presenter
Ben Nolan (born 1983), English cricketer
Bernie Nolan (1960–2013), Irish entertainer and actress
Bernie Nolan (footballer) (1883–1978), Australian rules footballer
Beth Nolan (born 1951), American lawyer and academic administrator
Bill Nolan (disambiguation), multiple people
Bob Nolan (1908–1980), Canadian singer-songwriter
Brandon Nolan (born 1983), Canadian ice hockey player 
Brian Nolan (1932–2006), Canadian journalist and author

C
Carol Nolan (born 1978), Irish politician
Catherine Nolan (born 1958), American politician
Charles Nolan (1957–2011), American fashion designer
Christina E. Nolan (born 1979), American lawyer
Christopher Nolan (disambiguation), multiple people
Clarrie Nolan (1904–1998), Australian rules footballer
Clive Nolan (born 1961), British musician and producer
Col Nolan (1938–2019), Australian musician
Coleen Nolan (born 1965), English television presenter
Conan Nolan, American journalist
Cynthia Reed Nolan (1908–1976), Australian writer

D
Daire Nolan (born 1968), Irish dancer
Danny Sue Nolan (1923–2002), American actress
David Nolan (disambiguation), multiple people
Deanna Nolan (born 1979), American basketball player
Deborah A. Nolan, American statistician
Dennis Nolan (disambiguation), multiple people
Derek Nolan (born 1982), Irish politician
Dick Nolan (disambiguation), multiple people
Doris Nolan (1916–1998), American actress
Doug Nolan (born 1976), American ice hockey player

E
Earl Nolan (1911–1991), American football player
Eda Nolan (born 1988), Filipino actress
Eddie Nolan (born 1988), Irish footballer
Edward Nolan (disambiguation), multiple people
Eileen Nolan (1920–2005), English army officer
Elaine Nolan (born 1981), Irish cricketer
Elizabeth Nolan (born 1978), American chemist
Emmet Nolan (born 1995), Irish hurler
Errol Nolan (born 1991), American sprinter
Evin Nolan (1930–2016), Irish painter

F
Faith Nolan (born 1957), Canadian musician
Francis Nolan, British phonetician
Frank Nolan (disambiguation), multiple people
Frankie Nolan (born 1950), Irish sportsperson
Frederick Nolan (disambiguation), multiple people

G
Garett Nolan (born 1997), American model
Garry Nolan, American immunologist
Gary Nolan (disambiguation), multiple people
Gavin Nolan (born 1977), Welsh painter
Geoff Nolan (born 1937), English cricketer
Gervais Nolan (1796–1857), French-Canadian fur trapper
Graham Nolan (born 1962), American comic book artist

H
Han Nolan (born 1956), American writer
Hayley Nolan (born 1997), Irish footballer
Henry Grattan Nolan (1893–1957), Canadian lawyer
Herb Nolan (1875–1933), Australian rules footballer
Howard Nolan (1865–1931), Australian minister
Howard C. Nolan Jr. (born 1932), American attorney

I
Ian Nolan (born 1970), Northern Irish footballer
Isabel Nolan (born 1974), Irish artist

J
Jack Nolan (disambiguation), multiple people
James Nolan (disambiguation), multiple people
Janne E. Nolan (1951–2019), American academic
Jeanette Nolan (1911–1998), American actress
Jerry Nolan (1946–1992), American drummer
Jerry Nolan (footballer) (1869–1947), Australian rules footballer
Joe Nolan (born 1951), American baseball player
Joe Nolan (ice hockey) (1929–1986), Canadian hockey player
John Nolan (disambiguation), multiple people
Johnny Nolan (1864–1907), English rugby union footballer
Jon Nolan (born 1992), English footballer
Jonathan Nolan (born 1976), British screenwriter
Jordan Nolan (born 1989), Canadian hockey player
Joseph Nolan (disambiguation), multiple people
Julia Nolan (1611–1701), Irish noble

K
Kathleen Nolan (born 1933), American actress
Katie Nolan (born 1987), American television host
Keith Nolan (disambiguation), multiple people
Ken Nolan, American screenwriter
Kenny Nolan (born 1949), American singer-songwriter
Kevin Nolan (born 1982), English footballer 
Kevin Nolan (Gaelic footballer) (born 1988), Irish Gaelic footballer
Kylie Nolan (born 1988), Welsh footballer

L
Laura Nolan (born 1994), Irish dancer
Leo Nolan (disambiguation), multiple people
Liam Nolan (disambiguation), multiple people
Linda Nolan (born 1959), Irish singer
Lloyd Nolan (1902–1985), American actor
Lou Nolan (born 1945), American public address announcer
Lou Nolan (artist) (1926–2008), American artist
Louis Nolan (1818–1854), British soldier 
Louisa Nolan (1898–??), Irish humanitarian

M
Mae Nolan (1886–1973), American politician
Margaret Nolan (1943–2020), English visual artist
Mark Edward Nolan (1901-1967), American lawyer and politician
Martin Nolan, American journalist
Mary Nolan (disambiguation), multiple people
Matthew Nolan (disambiguation), multiple people
Melanie Nolan (born 1960), New Zealand historian
Michael Nolan (disambiguation), multiple people
Mick Nolan, Irish Gaelic footballer
Mick Nolan (footballer) (1949–2008), Australian rules footballer
M. J. Nolan (born 1951), Irish politician
Monica Nolan (1913–1995), American tennis player

N
Nicholas M. Nolan (1835–1883), American soldier
Norma Nolan (born 1938), Argentinian beauty queen

O
Owen Nolan (born 1972), Canadian ice hockey player

P
Paddy Nolan (1862–1913), Irish-Canadian lawyer
Paddy Nolan (ice hockey) (1897–1957), Canadian hockey player
Pádraig Nolan (born 1964), Irish sportsperson
Pat Nolan (born 1950), American lawyer
Patrick Nolan (disambiguation), multiple people
Paul Nolan (disambiguation), multiple people
Percy Nolan (1886–1954), Australian solicitor and politician
Peter Nolan (born 1949), British academic
Philip Nolan (disambiguation), multiple people
Phillis Nolan (1946–2022), Irish lawn bowler
P. J. Nolan (born 1987), Irish hurler

R
Rachel Nolan (born 1974), Australian politician
Riall Nolan (born 1943), American anthropologist
Richard Nolan (disambiguation), multiple people
Rick Nolan (born 1943), American politician
Rob Nolan (born 1985), Canadian hockey player
Roger Nolan (born 1939), American police officer
Ronnie Nolan (born 1933), Irish footballer
Rose Nolan (born 1959), Australian artist
Ryan Nolan (born 1999), Irish footballer

S
Sam Nolan (born 1930), Irish trade unionist
Samuel Nolan (??–1997), American police officer
Seán Nolan, Irish politician
Sean Nolan (water polo) (born 1972), American water polo player
Shane Nolan, Irish hurler
Shirley Nolan (1942–2001), British teacher
Sidney Nolan (1917–1992), Australian painter
Sir Nolan (born 1990), American record producer
Stephen Nolan (born 1973), Northern Irish radio presenter
Stephen Nolan (hurler), Irish hurler
Steve Nolan, Irish rugby league footballer
Susan A. Nolan, American psychologist

T
Tania Nolan (born 1983), New Zealand actress
Ted Nolan (born 1958), Canadian ice hockey player and coach
Thomas Nolan (disambiguation), multiple people
Tim Nolan (born 1960), British bassist
Tim Nolan (politician) (born 1947), American politician
Todd Nolan, Irish hurler
Tom Nolan (disambiguation), multiple people
Troy Nolan (born 1986), American football player

V
Victoria Nolan, Canadian rower
Vincent Nolan (1936–1980), Irish police officer

W
William Nolan (disambiguation), multiple people
Willie Nolan (1896–1939), Irish golfer

Y
Yvette Nolan (born 1961), Canadian playwright
Yvonne Nolan, British politician

Fictional characters
Lynsey Nolan, character in UK TV series Hollyoaks

See also
Nolan (given name), a page for people with the given name "Nolan"
Nolan (disambiguation), a disambiguation page for "Nolan"
Senator Nolan (disambiguation), a disambiguation page for Senators surnamed "Nolan"
 Colby Nolan, a housecat who was awarded an MBA degree in 2004 by Trinity Southern University, a Texas-based diploma mill

References

External links
  Ted Nolan Foundation (with information on the Nolan surname)
  Nolan DNA Project (with information on the Nolan surname)

English-language surnames
Surnames of Irish origin
Anglicised Irish-language surnames